Jacqueline Nancy Mary Adams  (19 May 1926 – 27 March 2007) was a New Zealand botanical illustrator and museum curator.

Early life
Nancy Adams was born in Levin in 1926, the daughter of Jessie Whittaker and her husband, Kenneth Ernest Adams (grandson of early amateur botanist James Adams.) 

Adams' parents separated while she was still young and she grew up in Wellington with her maternal grandparents, the proprietors of the Whittaker's chocolate company. From early in her life Adams displayed a strong interest in both plants and drawing: ‘Right from the time I was very small, I knew somebody did the plant drawings in books. That’s what I wanted to do.’

Her interest was fostered at primary school, where her principal William Martin was an amateur botanist who taught students to draw from nature and took them on trips at Wellington Botanical Gardens. Adams attended Wellington Girls' College and Victoria University College, studying zoology and botany.

Career
Due to ill health, Adams did not complete her university studies. However, at 16 she joined the Botany division of New Zealand's Department of Scientific and Industrial Research (DSIR): the department was looking for staff to replace men serving in World War II. She worked there until 1959, when she was appointed to the Dominion Museum (now the Museum of New Zealand Te Papa Tongarewa) as assistant Curator of Botany with a special responsibility for algae. She retired from her position at the museum in 1987 but continued to be an Honorary Research Associate of the Museum.

Adams was a prolific artist, illustrating nearly forty publications on native plants, alpine life, trees and shrubs. Included in these publications is an article written by Ella Orr Campbell, a fellow New Zealander, for whom Adams drew Thallus of Marchasta bearing archegoniophores. She received international recognition for her detailed and delicate algal illustrations.

Awards and honours
Awards included the Loder Cup in 1964, and the New Zealand 1990 Commemoration Medal. She was appointed a Companion of the Queen's Service Order for public services in the 1989 New Year Honours, and a Commander of the Order of the British Empire, for services to botany, in the 1996 New Year Honours. In 1994, she received an award for her work Seaweeds of New Zealand: An Illustrated Guide, which held a description of 600 different plant species and illustrating 441. She is a Royal Society Te Apārangi 150 women in 150 words laureate.

Bibliography

 Trees and shrubs of New Zealand, by A. L. Poole and Nancy M. Adams, 1963
 Mountain Flowers in New Zealand, 1980
 Wild Flowers in New Zealand, 1980
 Seaweeds of New Zealand: An illustrated guide, 1994

References

External links

 Biography of Nancy Adams in Te Ara Encyclopedia of New Zealand
 Biography of Nancy Adams at Te Papa Museum of New Zealand
 Te Papa blog on Adams' work on Three Kings Islands
 Interview with Kate Hannah, author of Adams' biography on Te Ara RNZ, 27 June 2019

1926 births
2007 deaths
Botanical illustrators
20th-century New Zealand botanists

New Zealand Commanders of the Order of the British Empire
Companions of the Queen's Service Order
People from Levin, New Zealand
20th-century New Zealand painters
20th-century New Zealand women scientists
New Zealand women botanists